Entrepreneur First is an international talent investor, which supports individuals in building technology companies. Founded in 2011 by Matt Clifford and Alice Bentinck, the company has offices in Toronto, London, Berlin, Paris, Singapore, and Bangalore. 

Entrepreneur First has had more than 3,000 people go through its programme to create more than 300 companies worth over $10 billion as of 2022.

History

Entrepreneur First was founded in 2011 by Matt Clifford and Alice Bentinck, who had worked as management consultants at McKinsey & Company since 2009. According to Clifford, the model was inspired by a McKinsey project to develop a technology cluster in East London, which would tap "talented graduates" to create startups to bolster the cluster. Believing that the model would best succeed independently, Clifford and Bentinck left McKinsey and started the program themselves. Clifford serves as CEO while Bentinck is the CPO.

McKinsey & Company provided seed funding, and KPMG, Microsoft, and Sky were early corporate sponsors.

Bentinck founded Code First: Girls in late 2012 to address the decline of women working in the tech and digital workforce, which has led to a lack of diversity in the sector.

In 2016, after four years operating exclusively in London, Entrepreneur First announced its expansion to Singapore.

Clifford and Bentinck were awarded MBEs in the 2016 Birthday Honours for services to business. In 2017, it was announced that Reid Hoffman, co-founder of LinkedIn and Partner at Greylock, was leading a $12.4 million investment into Entrepreneur First. As part of his investment, Hoffman joined the board.

In 2018, Entrepreneur First expanded to four additional capitals: Berlin, Hong Kong, Paris and Bangalore. The company closed its Hong Kong office in 2019, and opened a Toronto office in 2020.

In 2021, it announced a partnership with Tezos Foundation to launch a platform for building Web3 startups in London, which will begin in October 2022. 

In July 2022, Entrepreneur First announced the raise of a $158 million Series C. Investors in the round included John Collison; Patrick Collison; Taavet Hinrikus; Reid Hoffman; Matt Mullenweg; Tom Blomfield; Nat Friedman; Demis Hassabis; Mustafa Suleyman; Elad Gil and Lachy Groom.

Programme
Entrepreneur First runs a 3-month long programme, called 'Form', which recruits talented individuals to meet co-founders and build technology companies from scratch. Over the course of the programme, individuals are encouraged to test co-founding partnerships with other participants, while developing and testing initial company ideas. During this time, participants are paid a stipend to cover their living costs, . 

At the end of this 3 month period, participants pitch their companies to Entrepreneur First's 'Investment Committee' to receive a first 'pre-seed' investment. Entrepreneur First invests £80,000 in each startup in Europe, C$100,000 in Canada and SG$75,000 in Asia. In return, it claims a 10 percent equity share.

Among its successful startups are Tractable (valued at $1 billion as of July 2021), Cleo, Omnipresent, Aztec, Hertzwell, Transcelestial, Airbank, and Magic Pony Technology - who sold to Twitter for a reported $150m only 18 months after the founders met on the programme.

Application process
Applicants do not need to have an idea for a business or a team in place before applying, but are evaluated solely on the basis of their ambition and talent. The programme looks for candidates who have either recently graduated, or have a few years of industry experience. 

The program receives roughly 10,000 applications per cohort, and accepts between 50 and 100 of them depending on the location. Many applicants are the products of the University of Cambridge, Imperial College London, University of Edinburgh, University College London, and the University of St Andrews. Entrepreneur First conducts its own talent searches to find and interest graduates in the program, encouraging them to apply "rather than joining Google or Facebook or doing a PhD or Postdoc".

Entrepreneur First differs from other accelerators such as Y Combinator and Wayra in that it works with individuals rather than companies. However, its successful startups have gone on to receive investor funding from Y Combinator, as well as from Balderton Capital, Index Ventures, Notion Capital, and Octopus Investments.

In July 2015, Entrepreneur First announced the establishment of an £8.5 million fund, backed by Encore Capital, Infocomm Investments, and angel investors such as Robin Klein and Alex Chesterman, which will enable it to accept 200 participants per year for the next three years.

References

British companies established in 2011
Companies based in the London Borough of Southwark
Business incubators of the United Kingdom
Startup accelerators
Venture capital firms of the United Kingdom